Pirate's Cove (German: Piratenbucht) is a board game designed by Paul Randles and Daniel Stahl, originally published in Germany in 2002 by Amigo Spiele, illustrated by Markus Wagner and Swen Papenbrock. In 2003, Days of Wonder republished the game with a new graphic design from Julien Delval and Cyrille Daujean. In the game, players play pirate ship captains seeking treasure from islands and bragging rights from defeating other pirates in naval combat.

Game play
The game takes place over 12 months (turns), with the goal of being the pirate with the most fame. Each player has a ship token and a card showing four aspects of the ship (crew, cannon, sail, and hull). At the beginning of each turn, a card is turned over at each island to reveal the potential booty from plunder. Each island (except Pirate's Cove and Treasure Island) offer various amounts of Fame, Gold, Treasure or Tavern cards.

Captains choose an island to plunder based on the potential rewards of that island and then fight if they show up at the same island. Certain islands offer the opportunity to upgrade an aspect of the ship and the available plunder at each island changes with each turn. A player can use this information to predict where other players' ships will turn up and thus move his ship accordingly to either do battle or avoid it. The bounty of each island is skewed so that some Islands are clearly better choices than others, so it can force you to decide (or bluff) if you think you can take the island should other pirates go after the same bounty. Ships that survive combat then plunder the islands, gain fame, and pay gold to upgrade their ships based on the qualities of the islands. The Legendary Pirate, a black ship token, moves clockwise around the board, forcing captains to steer out of his path unless they think that they can defeat the powerful ship. At Treasure Island, no battle can take place and it is where ships can safely discharge cargo from their ship and bury any plundered treasure (a ship's capacity to hold treasure is based on its hull rating). Burying treasure and money adds to the player's accumulated fame points.

Reception
Pirate's Cove won a Deutscher SpielePreis award as one of the top 10 games of 2002.

JD Wiker comments that "Pirate's Cove is a fun game for casual and hardcore gamers alike, and the constantly changing environment means that there's no single, perfect strategy. More to the point, it's an easy game to pick up, and only gets complicated if a player wants to dabble in the subsystems."

Reviews
Pyramid
Review in Scrye #68

Awards and honors
 2003 France - Nominee Tric Trac Silver Tric Trac
 2002 Bruno Faidutti - Game of the Year

References

External links
Days of Wonder's Pirate's Cove site with tutorials

Amigo Spiele games
Board games introduced in 2002
Days of Wonder games
Board games about history